HD 83058 is a subgiant star in the constellation Vela and a spectroscopic binary. It is visible to the naked eye with an apparent visual magnitude of 5.0. The system is moving further away with a heliocentric radial velocity of +.

HD 83058 has generally been considered to be a single star, but high-resolution spectra show it to be a double-lined spectroscopic binary. The two components have approximately the same spectral type. Line-profile variations have been detected which suggest that at least one component pulsates, as is common for stars of this spectral class.

HD 83058 was proposed as a runaway star from a supernova explosion. However, the discovery that it was a binary make this unlikely.

References

Vela (constellation)
Velorum, L
Durchmusterung objects
083058
046950
3819
Spectroscopic binaries
B-type subgiants